Cosgrove Hall Films (also known as Cosgrove Hall Productions) was an English animation studio founded by Brian Cosgrove and Mark Hall; its headquarters was in Chorlton-cum-Hardy, Manchester. Cosgrove Hall was once a major producer of children's television and animated programmes/films; Cosgrove Hall's programmes are still seen in over eighty countries. The company was wound down by its then owner, ITV plc, on 26 October 2009. It was mainly known for its series Danger Mouse, The Wind in the Willows and Count Duckula.

History

Stop Frame Productions

Brian Cosgrove and Mark Hall first met while both were students at Manchester College of Art and Design, which is now part of Manchester Metropolitan University. They later became co-workers at Granada Television, where they produced television graphics.

Hall left his job in 1969 and founded his own production company, Stop Frame Productions. Cosgrove joined the company shortly after its establishment. Their first projects, for Stop Frame, included public service films and television commercials for such companies as the TVTimes. From 1971 to 1972, the company released the animated series, The Magic Ball, which they created in a renovated shed located in the yard of Cosgrove's father-in-law. Hall directed two animated productions for Stop Frame, Captain Noah and His Floating Zoo, which was released in 1972, and the television series, Noddy, which aired in 1975. The company also produced opening credits and graphics for children's TV series such as Rainbow in 1972.

Cosgrove Hall Films
Stop Frame Productions halted production, and was closed, in mid 1975. However, Cosgrove and Hall were able to find new work in animation, specifically due to their earlier work on the 1972 series Rainbow. The producer of Rainbow, Thames Television, an ITV company, created a new, subsidiary, animation studio called Cosgrove Hall Films. Thames hired and commissioned Cosgrove and Hall as lead animators to create new animated programmes, for this new studio, based on their earlier work with Rainbow. Thames Television also hired John Hambley as Cosgrove Hall Films' first executive producer. Its first series was Chorlton and the Wheelies, the lead role being named after the suburb of Manchester where the company was based (the other characters were placed on wheels as this made the stop-frame animation easier). The pop singer and musician Bernard Sumner worked for Cosgrove Hall from 1976 until 1979 as a tracer.

Danger Mouse was one of the studio's earliest international successes. The studio made 161 episodes between 1981 and 1992. In each one, Danger Mouse, the world's greatest secret agent, and his well-meaning but useless sidekick Penfold, outwit the evil Baron Silas Greenback and various scoundrels. In 1983, the studio made a 75-minute film, The Wind in the Willows, based on Kenneth Grahame's classic story of the same name. It won a BAFTA award and an international Emmy award. Subsequently, the studio made a 52-episode TV series based on the characters between 1984 and 1990. All the music and songs for the feature and series were written by Keith Hopwood, late of Herman's Hermits and Malcolm Rowe. The Stone Roses guitarist John Squire worked on this series. Count Duckula was a spoof on the Dracula legend; its title character is the world's only vegetarian vampire. He aspires to be rich and famous. Originally he was a villain/henchman recurring in the Danger Mouse series, but got a spin-off series in 1988 that rapidly became one of Cosgrove Hall's most successful programmes, and a Cosgrove Hall staple to spin-off characters from each successive cartoon. Both shows also aired on Nickelodeon in the U.S. during the late 1980s, and were popular in the ratings for the channel. In 1989, the studio produced a full-length feature based on Roald Dahl's The BFG.

Truckers, the first book in The Bromeliad, was the studio's first collaboration with the best-selling author Terry Pratchett. The 1992 series follows the efforts of a group of nomes, whose spaceship crash-landed on Earth 15,000 years ago, to return home. In 1993, the ownership of Cosgrove Hall was transferred to Anglia Television, following the removal of Thames' ITV licence and, following a series of takeovers and mergers, ownership finally belonged to ITV plc. In 1997, Cosgrove Hall Films produced two series for Channel 4 based on Wyrd Sisters and Soul Music, two novels from Pratchett's Discworld series.

One of the studio's specialities was producing programmes for young children, such as Noddy's Toyland Adventures, Bill and Ben, and Andy Pandy for the BBC. The latter two series were based on classic characters from the 1950s. In the mid-2000s, Cosgrove Hall worked on a new version of Postman Pat. The studio also animated Ghosts of Albion, the BBC's first fully animated webcast. Website visitors could learn about the production and help to develop the story. Cosgrove Hall produced Scream of the Shalka, a Doctor Who animated story for the BBC website. In 2006, they animated the missing first and fourth episodes of the Doctor Who serial The Invasion for a DVD release.

In 2008, shortly after Granada Television became the only surviving franchisee of Independent Television in England and Wales, all except four staff were made redundant by ITV, and Cosgrove Hall moved 'in house' to the Granada Television Studios in Manchester, ending 30 years of the studio in Chorlton. The company's owner, ITV Granada, was not very interested in investing in Cosgrove Hall, and a financial review decided that the company was no longer viable. The British animation production industry was struggling due to increasingly tough competition from state-subsidised production in other countries where the industry was growing and very buoyant.

The company was again put under review by ITV plc in October 2009, being absorbed, and ceasing to exist, a few months later. Cosgrove Hall was developing Theodore, a CGI-animated series, when ITV absorbed the company. The land occupied by Cosgrove Hall's studios, in Albany Road, Chorlton, adjacent to the town's telephone exchange, which had stood empty for two years, was finally sold in the summer of 2010 to a housing development company. The intention was to demolish the historic studios and build retirement flats. During 2012, the studios were eventually demolished as part of the above development. Urban explorers who visited the site during the demolition found and photographed some models and backgrounds used in previous productions. Coincidentally, during April of that year it was announced that during the past summer, prior to the death of Mark Hall, he and Brian Cosgrove had pitched the idea of resurrecting the brand to possible investors.

Brian Cosgrove is now the executive producer at CHF Entertainment, as was Hall until his untimely death. On 18 November 2011, Cosgrove Hall Films closed down due to Mark Hall’s death of cancer at the age of 75. Now, CHF Entertainment are actively working on a number of television series, including Pip Ahoy!, which is aimed at pre-school children and HeroGliffix, which is aimed at older children.

Filmography

Films
The Talking Parcel (Thames for ITV, 1978) (TV film)
Ersatz (1978) (directed by Chris Taylor)
Cinderella (Thames for ITV, 1979) (TV special)
The Pied Piper of Hamelin (Thames for ITV, 1981) (TV special)
The Wind in the Willows (Thames for ITV, 1983) (TV film)
The Reluctant Dragon (Thames for ITV, 1987) (TV special)
A Tale of Two Toads (Thames for ITV, 1989) (TV film)
The BFG (1989 film)
The Fool of the World and the Flying Ship (Thames for ITV, 1990) (TV special)
Peter and the Wolf (1995) (TV special) (animation)
BBC Children in Need - Small People (stop-motion segments for 1998 promo)
Mr Scruff (music video) (co-production with Four23Films)

Short films
The Sandman (Channel 4, 1991) (short film)
Welcome to the Discworld (1996) (short film) (co-production with Carrington Productions International)
Blink (2001) (short film)
One Night (2001) (short film, directed by Brian Demoskoff)
The Trojan Horse (2001) (short film) (followed by Tindersticks: Dying Slowly)

Television series

1970s
The Magic Ball (Granada for ITV, 1971-1972)
Rainbow (Thames for ITV, 1972-1976) (animated sequences)
Captain Noah and His Floating Zoo (Granada for ITV, 1972)
Sally and Jake (Thames for ITV, 1973-1974)
Noddy (Thames for ITV, 1975)
Chorlton and the Wheelies (Thames for ITV, 1976-1979)
Jamie and the Magic Torch (Thames for ITV, 1976-1980)
Grandma Bricks of Swallow Street (animation made for Rainbow) (1976-1977)
The Kenny Everett Video Show (Thames for ITV, 1978-1981) (Captain Kremmen shorts)

1980s
Cockleshell Bay (Thames for ITV, 1980–1986)
Danger Mouse (Thames for ITV, 1981-1992)
The Wind in the Willows (Thames for ITV, 1984-1987)
Alias the Jester (Thames for ITV, 1985-1986)
Creepy Crawlies (ITV, 1987-1989)
Count Duckula (Thames/Central for ITV, 1988-1993)

1990s
Oh, Mr. Toad (Thames for ITV, 1990)
Victor & Hugo: Bunglers in Crime (Thames for ITV, 1991-1992)
Truckers (Thames for ITV, 1992)
Noddy's Toyland Adventures (Children's BBC, 1992-2000)
On Christmas Eve (1992) (TV special) (co-production with Grasshopper Productions)
Avenger Penguins (Granada/Anglia for ITV, 1993–1994)
Opéra imaginaire (1993) ("Pêcheurs de perles" short)
The Mutinearlys (Children's BBC, 1994-1996) (co-production with BBC Enterprises)
Oakie Doke (Children's BBC, 1995-1996)
Fantomcat (Anglia for ITV, 1995-1996)
Sooty's Amazing Adventures (Meridian for ITV, 1996-1997)
Brambly Hedge (episodes 1-4) (Children's BBC, 1996-1997) (co-production with HIT Entertainment)
Soul Music (Channel 4, 1997) (co-production with Carrington Productions International)
Wyrd Sisters (Channel 4, 1997) (co-production with Carrington Productions International)
Captain Star (HTV for ITV, 1997-1998) (co-production with Teletoon and Nickelodeon UK)
Enid Blyton's Enchanted Lands (Children's BBC, 1997-1998)
The Animal Shelf (Anglia for ITV, 1997–2000)
Father Christmas and the Missing Reindeer (1997) (TV special) (co-production with Millimages)
Rocky and the Dodos (Central for ITV, 1998-1999)
Lavender Castle (HTV for CITV, 1999) (co-production with Carrington Productions International and Gerry Anderson Productions)
Rotten Ralph (CBBC, 1999-2001) (co-production with Italtoons UK and Tooncan Enterprises Ltd)
The Foxbusters (Anglia for CITV, 1999-2000) (co-production with United Productions)
The Noddy Shop (PBS, 1999) (Series 2, additional Noddy animation in live-action scenes)
Timekeepers of the Millennium (development for a series produced by The Foundation for ITV in association with NMEC, 1999)

2000s
The Tales of Little Grey Rabbit (HTV for CITV, 2000)
Fetch the Vet (2000-2001) (co-production with Flextech Television)
Vampires, Pirates & Aliens (2000) (co-production with Millimages and France Animation)
Bill and Ben (2001-2002, Co-production with Ben Productions LLC and BBC Worldwide)
Andy Pandy  (Remake, 2002, Co-production with Ben Productions LLC and BBC Worldwide)
Engie Benjy (2002-2004, Co-production with Granada Kids)
Albie (2002-2004, co-production with Granada Kids)
Adventurers: Masters of Time (2002) (co-production with SBAF Berlin Animation Film GmbH)
Little Robots (2003-2008) (co-production with Create TV and Film Limited)
Shadow of the Elves (2003) (co-production with SBAF Berlin Animation Film GmbH)
Postman Pat (Series 3-6, 2004–2008) (co-production with Entertainment Rights)
The Oddkinsons - A United Family (2003) (co-production with Manchester United Ltd)
Ghosts of Albion (BBCi, 2003) (webcast)
Sixty Second Lovestory (2003) (short film, directed by Brian Demoskoff)
Cosmorados (2003) (co-production with BBC Three's Animation Unit and BBC Talent)
Sorted (2004) (3 minute animated fill-ins made for the show, produced by Libra Television for Discovery Kids)
Pocoyo (Series 1, 2005) (co-production with Zinkia Entertainment and Granada Kids)
Blue Dog Blues (2005) (short film)
Fifi and the Flowertots (Nick Jr. and Milkshake!, 2005-2010) (co-production with Chapman Entertainment)
Kid Clones (2005) (co-production with Toon Factory Ltd and Agogo Media)
The Wumblers (2006) (co-production with Peak Entertainment and The Silly Goose Company)
The Likeaballs (CBBC, 2006) (produced by Cosgrove House and Animated Adventures & Pictures)
Rupert Bear, Follow the Magic... (Milkshake!, 2006-2008) (co-production with Entertainment Rights and Express Newspapers)
Roary the Racing Car (Nick Jr. and Milkshake!, 2007-2010) co-production with Chapman Entertainment)
Eddie Retractorhead (Nickelodeon, 2008)
Rocket Boy and Toro (CBBC, 2008)
Postman Pat: Special Delivery Service (2008, series 1) (co-production with Entertainment Rights)
Theodore (2009-2010) (was about to be developed for ITV during their absorption with the company)

Pilots
SuperTed (1975)
Trash (Nickelodeon, 1989)
The Crowville Chronicles (Nickelodeon, 1989)
The Mutinearlies (1993) (co-production with BBC Enterprises Ltd)
Mungie (1996) (co-production with BBC Animation Unit)
The Story of Odysseus (1996) (co-production with Carrington Productions International)
The Wot-a-Lots (later known as The Beeps) (directed by Sarah Ball) (1997)
Meet the Frankensteins (1998)
The Little Grey Men (written by Steve Walker) (1998)
Winnie the Pooh (1999) (pilot for a stop-motion direct-to-video version of the popular Disney adaption by Bridget Appleby)
Eloise (2000) (co-production with The itsy bitsy Entertainment Company and Cartoon Saloon)
Mouth and Trousers (2000)
The Thwarting of Baron Bolligrew (2001)
Porter and Daughter (2001) (Engie Benjy pilot, co-production with ITEL)
Junglekids (2001)
F1: Race for the Future (2001)
Saturday Night Livestock (2001)
The Inbreds (2002) (pilot for adult animated series, once launched an official website)
The Kittens (2002) (Failed pilot for an Atomic Kitten animated series)
Shelltown (2003)
CodeWarriors (2004) (co-produced with Granada)
The Rag Pack (2004) (co-production with VGI Entertainment)
The Slums (2004) (co-production with Streetplay Design Ltd)
Super Hero High (2004)
Harold's Planet (2004)
Beat Freaks (2004) (co-production with Spin Entertainment and Mainframe Entertainment)
Octopus and Worm (2005)
The Carrotty Kid (2005) (once launched an official website)
Wobbly Horse (2005)
The Mystics (2005)
The Boy Who Kicked Pigs (2005)
Hamster in a Cage (2006)
A Break From The Old Routine (2007) (co-production with S4C)
My Neighbour is an Evil Genius (2007)
Roger to the Rescue (2007)
The Princess Bumblees (2007)
Squidge and the Hardnuts (2008)
Ruby to the Rescue (CBeebies, 2009) (co-production with Nelvana)

Other
I Love 1981 (2001) (Danger Mouse's interview animation for BBC documentary)
The Oddkinsons - A United Family (2003) (webcast, co-production with Manchester United)
Doctor Who (2003 - 2007) (Scream of the Shalka webcast, an animated reconstruction of The Invasion and the televised serial The Infinite Quest)
Ghosts of Albion (BBCi, 2003) (Legacy webcast)
Sorted (2004) (3-minute animated fill-ins for Libra Television and Discovery Kids UK)
Love on a Saturday Night (2004) (additional animated fill-in graphics for LWT)
Top 10 Conspiracy Theories (2004) (animated graphics for Liberty Bell and Channel 5)

References

 Some text modified from the Animation Gallery of the National Media Museum

External links
Official Cosgrove Hall Films Site

 
British companies established in 1976
British companies disestablished in 2009
British animation studios
Culture in Manchester
Defunct companies based in Manchester
Defunct film and television production companies of the United Kingdom
Entertainment companies established in 1976
Mass media companies established in 1976
Mass media companies disestablished in 2009
Entertainment companies disestablished in 2009
1976 establishments in England
2009 disestablishments in England
1994 mergers and acquisitions
2000 mergers and acquisitions
2004 mergers and acquisitions